Sergei Dubov (4 February 1943 – 1 February 1994) was a Russian journalist, publisher and entrepreneur. The Independent called him a "brilliant businessman".

Biography 
Dubov graduated from the Moscow Poligraphical Institute (now the Moscow State University of Printing Arts) editorial department. He worked on TV and then for the newspaper Book Review. He became chairman of the "New Times" publishing house, which published Vsyo Dlya Vas, Novoye Vremya, and International and Moscow Business Week.

He was the first publisher in Russian of Viktor Suvorov's books Icebreaker, Aquarium, Day-M and others.

Death 
He was murdered on 1 February 1994. The assassin waited in a phone booth, and when Dubov was going to his car in the morning shot him in the back of the head. Earlier, Dubov had received threats by telephone and by mail. There was a team of investigators from the Ministry of Interior, and the MUR (abbreviation for The Moscow Investigation Department) District police station established to investigate the murder. President Boris Yeltsin closely monitored the case. However, it has never been resolved.

See also
List of unsolved murders

Notes and references

External links
 The Great Biographical Encyclopedia. 2009.
 Bulletin of the Atomic Scientists Jan 1995

External links 
 ДУБОВ СЕРГЕЙ (1943—1994)
 Дубов, Сергей Леонидович
 Дубов Сергей Леонидович
 От Солженицына до журнала знакомств «Амур»
 Мемориал погибших журналистов
 Дубов Сергей
 Sergei Dubov
 Sergei Dubov
 Funeral of Sergei Dubov
 On the morning of 1 February 1994, Sergei Dubov, president of the Novoye vremya publishing house, was shot dead outside the stairwell of his apartment block in north Moscow as he was leaving for work.
 Interview with Vladimir Rezun (Victor Suvorov)
 Russian tycoon shot dead: Mafia suspected as Solzhenitsyn’s publisher dies in street shooting
 Dødslisten Norsk Journalistlag (NJ) fortrenger
 Murdering with Impunity in Russia: Authorities Fail to Prosecute the Murders of Seven Journalists

1943 births
1994 deaths
1994 murders in Russia
20th-century Russian journalists
Assassinated Russian journalists
Deaths by firearm in Russia
Journalists killed in Russia
Male murder victims
Russian media executives
Unsolved murders in Russia